Culoptila aguilerai is a species of caddisfly, known from fossils preserved in Mexican amber. The species is named after Eliseo Palacios Aguilera.

References

Glossosomatidae
Insects described in 2006
Prehistoric insects
Mexican amber